The A10 is a major road in England which runs between The City of London and King's Lynn in Norfolk. 

At its southern terminus, the route meets the A3 directly north of London Bridge, above Monument London Underground station. At its northern end, the A10 meets the A47 and A149 roads south-west of King's Lynn town centre. The route passes through or around primary destinations in Greater London, Hertfordshire, Cambridgeshire and Norfolk, including Dalston, Enfield, Hertford, Cambridge, Ely and Downham Market. 

The route between Bishopsgate in the City of London and Royston, Hertfordshire, roughly follows the path of Ermine Street, a Roman road.

Route

City of London 
At its southern end, the A10 begins at a junction with the A3, on the northern bank of the River Thames. The A3 runs southbound over London Bridge towards Elephant and Castle, before continuing to Clapham, Kingston upon Thames, Guildford and Portsmouth. At the junction the A10 also meets Cannon Street (towards St Pauls Cathedral and Blackfriars), King William Street (towards Bank) and Eastcheap (towards Tower Hill). Monument tube station on the Circle and District lines is directly below the junction. The Monument to the Great Fire of London is south-east of the junction.

Running north from the junction, the A10 is carried by Gracechurch Street, Bishopsgate and Norton Folgate. Liverpool Street station - the London terminus of the West Anglia Main Line (down to Enfield, Hertford, Stansted Airport and Cambridge) and the Great Eastern Main Line (down to Southend, Chelmsford, Ipswich and Norwich) - sits directly west of the A10 Bishopsgate. 22 Bishopsgate is the second-tallest building in London, and the tallest within The Square Mile.

Greater London 
Leaving the City of London northbound, the A10 is carried by Shoreditch High Street. The route meets the A1202 Great Eastern Street/Commercial Street - the London Inner Ring Road - directly to the south-west of Shoreditch High Street London Overground station.

The London Inner Ring Road forms the boundary to the London Congestion Charge zone. The A10 falls within the charging zone between the A3 London Bridge and the ring road.

North from the ring road, the A10 is carried by Kingsland Road, Kingsland High Street and Stoke Newington Road, before meeting a gyratory in the Stoke Newington area (Stoke Newington High Street, Northwold Road, Rectory Road and Manse Road). The A10 continues along Stamford Hill, Tottenham High Road, Bruce Grove, Lordship Lane and The Roundway - a crescent around the original Tower Gardens Estate (Tottenham's Garden Suburb), shared with the A1080.

The A10 passes Haggerston, Dalston Junction, Dalston Kingsland, Rectory Road, Stoke Newington, South Tottenham and Seven Sisters London Overground stations, and Seven Sisters tube station.

Northbound from The Roundway, the A10 is carried by Great Cambridge Road, a dual carriageway.

Along Great Cambridge Road, the A10 meets the A406 North Circular Road. Between A3 London Bridge and the North Circular Road, the A10 falls within the Ultra Low Emission Zone. The A10 then passes through Southbury, cutting between Edmonton and Enfield before meeting the M25 London Orbital motorway at junction 25 (the Greater London and London Low Emission Zone boundaries).

In Greater London and the City of London, the A10 is managed by Transport for London.

Hertfordshire 
In Hertfordshire, leaving the M25 motorway junction, the A10 meets the A121 and B198 roads at a roundabout. Waltham Cross sits directly east of the route.

Continuing north, the A10 dual carriageway runs unbroken until Standon, passing Cheshunt, Broxbourne, Hoddesdon, Hertford, Ware and Wadesmill - through the Lea Valley. The route meets with the primary routes A414 (for Hertford town centre, Harlow and Chelmsford), A602 (for Stevenage) and the A120 (for Bishop's Stortford and Stansted Airport).

The dual carriageway then passes around the western perimeter of Puckeridge before becoming a single carriageway primary route near Westmill. The A10 becomes the Buntingford bypass, then continues north through Chipping, Buckland, Reed and Royston, to meet the A505 (for Baldock and Newmarket) at Hertfordshire's border with Cambridgeshire. The A10 through Royston is a gyratory comprising Market Hill, Priory Lane and Barkway Street.

Cambridgeshire 
The A10 has been split into two sections in Cambridgeshire.

The southern section runs between Royston and the M11 motorway at junction 11. The single-carriageway route passes between the villages of Meldreth and Melbourn, along the south-eastern edge of Shepreth and through Foxton, Harston and Hauxton. At the M11 junction 11, the A10 meets the A1309 which continues into Cambridge City Centre, past the Trumpington Park and Ride.

The northern section runs between the A14 at junction 33 (Milton Interchange) and the River Little Ouse. Access from the Milton Interchange into Cambridge is via the A1309 southbound, near Cambridge Science Park - which is directly south-west of the junction - and Cambridge North railway station.

Northbound from the A14, the A10 runs along the western edge of Milton, passing Milton Park and Ride. The route also passes Landbeach, Waterbeach, Stretham and Little Thetford, crossing the River Great Ouse between Waterbeach and Stretham.

South of Ely, the A10 meets the A142 (for Chatteris, Soham and Newmarket). The route forms the western bypass to the City of Ely and Littleport before crossing the River Great Ouse for a second time. The A10 runs along the eastern bank of the Ouse until Southery in Norfolk, entering the county near Black Horse Drove.

Norfolk 
In Norfolk, the A10 passes Southery, Hilgay, Fordham, Denver, Downham Market, Tottenhill and West Winch before reaching the A47 (for Peterborough, Wisbech, Swaffham and Norwich). In Norfolk, the A10 meets the primary routes A1122 (for Wisbech and Swaffham) and A134 (for Thetford). The route also meets the A149 for Cromer and Hunstanton (known locally as The Coast Road), and King's Lynn town centre.

Major junctions

History

Ermine Street 

Between The City of London and Royston, the A10 follows a similar course to the Ermine Street Roman road.

Ermine Street was one of the radial routes from Londinium, with its southern terminus at Bishopsgate - one of the gates in the ruined London Wall. The gate stood where the A10 intersects with the A1211 Wormwood Street/Camomile Street. It was demolished in 1760.

At Royston, where the A10 bears north-east towards Cambridge, Ermine Street crosses the Icknield Way (between Wiltshire and Norfolk).

North of Royston, Ermine Street runs north towards Durovigutum (Godmanchester), Lindum Colonia (Lincoln) and Eboracum (York).

Bishopsgate lends its name to the street carrying the A10 between Leadenhall Street and Spital Square.

The A10 carries the name Ermine Street between Buntingford and Buckland in Hertfordshire. Ermine Street also lends its name to a ward in the North Hertfordshire council area, which is crossed by the A10 London Road (south of Royston).

Road numbering 
The A10 first featured in the Ministry of Transport List of Class I and Class II Roads and Numbers 1922-1923. According to The Society for All British and Irish Road Enthusiasts (SABRE) wiki, the A10 was designated the route London (Kingsland Road - Stamford Hill) - Tottenham - Ware - Royston - Cambridge - Ely - King's Lynn.

The A10 is one of two routes designated to run between London and Cambridge - the other being the M11 "London to Cambridge" motorway. The southern terminus of the M11 links with the A406 North Circular Road and A12 in the Woodford area of the London Borough of Redbridge. The two routes meet at the M11 junction 11, west of Trumpington. The motorway opened between 1975 and 1980.

The 1922 A10 route has been bypassed several times, with new road numbers on the original route. These include:

 A1010 through Edmonton and Waltham Cross;
 A1170 through Wormley, Broxbourne, Hoddesdon, Great Amwell and Ware;
 A1309 through Trumpington, Cambridge and Chesterton.

References

External links

Society for All British Road Enthusiasts entry for the A10
Road to Nowhere – A10
M25 Junction 25 improvements/

Streets in London
Transport in the City of London
Roads in England
Roads in Cambridgeshire
Roads in Hertfordshire
Roads in London
Transport in the London Borough of Enfield
Transport in the London Borough of Hackney
Transport in the London Borough of Haringey
Streets in the London Borough of Enfield